Bad Doberan-Land is an Amt in the district of Rostock, in Mecklenburg-Vorpommern, Germany. The seat of the Amt is in Bad Doberan, itself not part of the Amt.

Subdivision
The Amt Bad Doberan-Land consists of the following municipalities:
 Admannshagen-Bargeshagen
 Bartenshagen-Parkentin
 Börgerende-Rethwisch
 Hohenfelde
 Nienhagen
 Reddelich
 Retschow
 Steffenshagen
 Wittenbeck

References

Ämter in Mecklenburg-Western Pomerania